Kari Juhani Laitinen (born April 9, 1964) is a Finnish ice hockey player. He won a silver medal at the 1988 Winter Olympics.

Career statistics

Regular season and playoffs

International

References

External links
Biography on DatabaseOlympics.com

1964 births
Living people
Finnish ice hockey right wingers
Ice hockey players at the 1988 Winter Olympics
Olympic ice hockey players of Finland
Olympic medalists in ice hockey
Olympic silver medalists for Finland
Sportspeople from Vantaa
Medalists at the 1988 Winter Olympics